Paul Noel McGinley (born 16 December 1966) is an Irish professional golfer who has won four events on the European Tour. At the 2002 Ryder Cup, he famously holed a ten-foot putt on the 18th hole in his match against Jim Furyk at The Belfry which won the Ryder Cup for Europe. He was the winning captain of Europe in the 2014 Ryder Cup and the first Irishman to captain Europe's Ryder Cup side.

Early years
McGinley was raised in Rathfarnham and was educated at St Mary's BNS and Coláiste Éanna. His father Mick — who is from Dunfanaghy — played Gaelic football for Donegal, while his mother Julia comes from Rathmullan. McGinley himself was born in Dublin and studied at Dublin Institute of Technology. After his knee injury McGinley turned his full attention to golf. McGinley later said that when he played golf as part of a team it helped to raise his game to another level. He credited his experience of Gaelic football for his passion for team sports and suggested it played a part in why he was appointed European captain for the 2014 Ryder Cup.

McGinley won the 1989 Irish Amateur Close Championship and the 1991 South of Ireland Championship at Lahinch Golf Club. He was selected for the 1991 Britain & Ireland Walker Cup team at Portmarnock Golf Club, just north of Dublin, where a strong American team that included Phil Mickelson beat Britain & Ireland 14–10.

Professional career
McGinley turned professional in late 1991 and joined the European Tour in 1992, aged 25. In 1993, he lost a playoff to Costantino Rocca in the French Open. In 1994, McGinley lost a playoff to José María Olazábal in the Open Mediterrania.

McGinley eventually won his first title on the European Tour at the 1996 Hohe Brücke Open (formerly known as the Austrian Open). In 1997 he won the World Cup of Golf for Ireland with Pádraig Harrington (who attended the same secondary school, Coláiste Éanna, as McGinley).

At the 2001 Celtic Manor Resort Wales Open, McGinley won the tournament on the fifth extra hole of a playoff in an event that was so badly disrupted by torrential rain that it was reduced to just 36 holes. After his victory, McGinley quipped: "Goran Ivanišević said God sent the rain for him at Wimbledon and maybe he sent it for me too!"

McGinley's best finish in one of the four major championships is a tie for 6th place in the 2004 PGA Championship. He has featured in the top 20 of the Official World Golf Ranking. His best season on the European Tour was in 2005, when he finished third on the Order of Merit. He made the cut in 21 out of 23 events that year and gained his fourth and, to date, last European Tour victory in the season-ending Volvo Masters at the Valderrama Golf Club in Spain. McGinley started his final round four shots off the lead. He shot a final round of 67 for the biggest individual tournament win of his career, finishing two strokes ahead of Spain's Sergio García.

Before his victory in the 2005 Volvo Masters, McGinley had three runner-up finishes in tournaments that year, finishing second to Ángel Cabrera in the BMW Championship at Wentworth and losing in the final of the HSBC World Match Play Championship at the same venue to New Zealander Michael Campbell (2 & 1). In an absorbing contest, Campbell clinched the title with a half on the penultimate hole after McGinley had driven wildly into the trees on the previous two holes. McGinley later said he was "hurt like you can't imagine" after losing in the final. He said: "I fought as hard as I could and I'm bitterly disappointed."

At the 2005 TCL Classic, McGinley shot a final round of 63 to force a sudden-death playoff with Paul Casey. However, on the second extra hole Casey holed a 25-foot birdie putt from the back of the green to win the title.

At the 2008 KLM Open played in the Netherlands, McGinley shot a final round of 64 to finish runner-up in the tournament, behind Darren Clarke.

Ryder Cup
McGinley made three consecutive Ryder Cup appearances in 2002, 2004 and 2006, with Europe being victorious each time. In the 2002 Ryder Cup, his ten-foot putt on the 18th hole in his match against Jim Furyk secured the ½ point Europe needed for victory; the team eventually won 15½ to 12½. In the 2006 Ryder Cup at The K Club in Ireland, McGinley offered a handshake and conceded a 20-foot putt for a half to J. J. Henry on the 18th green of his last day singles match because he feared his opponent might have been put off when a streaker ran across the green.

In the 2010 and 2012 matches, McGinley served as one of the European vice-captains to Colin Montgomerie and José María Olazábal respectively. On 15 January 2013, he was named the Europe team captain for the 2014 Ryder Cup. In May 2013, McGinley gave European player Sergio García his backing following a public feud that the Spaniard had with Tiger Woods and a controversial "fried chicken" remark that García made about Woods. In an interview with BBC Radio 5 Live, McGinley said: "I think there's a personality clash and they don't particularly like each other's company. For me, it's no big deal. He apologised for it and, as far as I'm concerned, we move on. People make mistakes and say things all the time that they regret and didn't mean." In September, Europe went on to win the 2014 Ryder Cup by five points.

Personal life
McGinley is married to wife Alison. She formerly played golf for England and on the Ladies European Tour. They have three children and currently reside in Sunningdale, England. McGinley is an executive fellow of the Leadership Institute at the London Business School.

In 2008, McGinley spoke of his relief after his daughter Maia survived a 20–foot fall down a manhole. She was six years old at the time when she slipped on a dislodged manhole cover and plunged down the drain. She was taken to hospital but remarkably had no serious injuries. McGinley said: "We are just so lucky and so grateful she is fine."

McGinley enjoys association football and is a fan of Celtic and West Ham United.

Amateur wins
1988 Irish Youths Championship, Scottish Youths Championship
1989 Irish Amateur Close Championship
1991 South of Ireland Championship

Professional wins (10)

European Tour wins (4)

*Note: The 2001 Celtic Manor Resort Wales Open was shortened to 36 holes due to rain.

European Tour playoff record (1–3)

Other wins (6)

Results in major championships

CUT = missed the half-way cut
"T" = tied

Summary

Most consecutive cuts made – 5 (2004 Open Championship – 2005 PGA)
Longest streak of top-10s – 1 (twice)

Results in The Players Championship

CUT = missed the halfway cut

Results in World Golf Championships

1Cancelled due to 9/11

QF, R16, R32, R64 = Round in which player lost in match play
"T" = Tied
NT = No tournament

Team appearances
Amateur
Walker Cup (representing Great Britain & Ireland): 1991
European Amateur Team Championship (representing Ireland): 1991

Professional
Alfred Dunhill Cup (representing Ireland): 1993, 1994, 1996, 1997, 1998, 1999, 2000
World Cup (representing Ireland): 1993, 1994, 1997 (winners), 1998, 1999, 2000, 2001, 2002, 2003, 2004, 2005, 2006, 2008
Ryder Cup (representing Europe): 2002 (winners), 2004 (winners), 2006 (winners), 2014 (non-playing captain, winners)
Record: 9 matches, 4.5 points (50% Point Percentage)
All formats (W–L–H): 2–2–5 = 4.5pts
Singles: 1–0–2 = 2pts
Foursomes: 1–2–1 = 1.5pts
Fourballs: 0–0–2 = 1pt
Seve Trophy (representing Great Britain & Ireland): 2002 (winners), 2005 (winners), 2009 (winners, non-playing captain), 2011 (winners, non-playing captain)
Royal Trophy (representing Europe): 2006 (winners), 2007 (winners), 2009

See also
List of people on stamps of Ireland

References

External links

Irish male golfers
European Tour golfers
Ryder Cup competitors for Europe
St Michael's (Donegal) Gaelic footballers
People educated at Coláiste Éanna
Alumni of Dublin Institute of Technology
Sportspeople from County Dublin
Sportspeople from County Donegal
1966 births
Living people